This is a list of inactive and potentially active volcanoes in metropolitan France.

The Chaîne des Puys, the largest volcanic ensemble in Europe, is located in metropolitan France.

See also 

 List of volcanoes in French Polynesia
 List of volcanoes in French Southern and Antarctic Lands
 List of volcanoes in Martinique
 List of volcanoes in Réunion

References

Volcanoes
France
 
Volcanoes of Metropolitan France